The Speaker's Advisory Committee on Works of Art of the British House of Commons chooses an official Election Artist to document the election campaigns in the United Kingdom's general elections. In 2001 the official artist was Jonathan Yeo, with Simon Roberts chosen for 2010. In 2015 the artist was Adam Dant. In the 2017 snap election the artist was Cornelia Parker. Nicky Hirst was the 2019 election artist.

References

Elections in the United Kingdom